The Conqueror of the World (Italian:Il conquistatore del mondo) is a 1919 Italian silent film directed by Roberto Roberti and starring Francesca Bertini and Sandro Salvini.

Cast
 Francesca Bertini 
 Sandro Salvini

References

Bibliography
 Parish, James Robert. Film Actors Guide. Scarecrow Press, 1977.

External links

1919 films
1910s Italian-language films
Films directed by Roberto Roberti
Italian silent films
Italian black-and-white films